Marie Lera (Héliard; pen names, Jean D'Anin and Marc Hélys; 2 June 1864 – 9 October 1958) was a French journalist, novelist, and translator. She is best known for her book, Le secret des "Désenchantées". Lera died in 1958.

Biography
Hortense Marie Héliard was born on 2 June 1864, in Saint-Nazaire. From childhood, she was taught English and Italian and, thanks to her nanny, Swedish too.

She started her career in journalism by writing a report on Scandinavia, adopting the pen names "Jean D'Anin" and "Marc Hélys" when publishing her works.

During her two stays in Constantinople, Lera created relationships and spent time with two women, which opened doors for her and helped her understand the ideological debates in regard to Ottoman women. Lera wrote a book, Le jardin fermé, which she presented as a testimony on the condition of women and the events that marked her time in Constantinople, but which in reality was a summary of hearsay punctuated with romantic inventions. Lera was best known for her book, Le secret des "Désenchantées", published under the pseudonym of "Marc Hélys", which described how the literary success of Pierre Loti's Les désenchantées resulted from a deception of which she was the one of the authors during her second stay in Constantinople in 1904.

Lera became interested in feminism while in several foreign countries. In 1906, she published À travers le féminisme en Suède (Paris, Plon-Nourrit). She was also a translator (from Italian, English, Swedish, and Polish), using the pseudonym "Jean d'Anin". 

Her husband was the Mexican diplomat Carlos Americo Lera. Marie Lera died on 9 October 1958, in Bron.

Selected works

As "Marie Lera"
 Les Petits Boërs : épisode de la guerre du Transvaal en 1900, 1900

As "Jean d'Anin"
 Laquelle ? - Collection Stella, no. 107, 1903

As "Marc Hélys"
À travers le féminisme suédois, 1906
Le Jardin fermé, scènes de la vie féminine en Turquie,  1908
Cantinière de la Croix-Rouge 1914-1916, 1917
L'Envers d'un roman  : Le secret des "Désenchantées" révélé par celle qui fut Djénan, 1923

Translations as "Marc Hélys"
 Aimé pour lui-même - Collection Stella, no. 22 (French translation of the novel Brewster's Millions, by George Barr McCutcheon) 1902
Le Vieux Manoir (French translation of a Swedish short story by Selma Lagerlöf)
Dans le désert (French translation of the Italian novel Sino al confine, by Grazia Deledda), Paris, Hachette, 1912
Une héroïne de la Renaissance italienne, Caterina Sforza, 1463-1509 (partial French translation of Caterina Sforza, 3 volume edition by the Italian historian, Pier Desiderio Pasolini)
Des roseaux sous le vent(French translation of the Italian novel Canne al vento, by Grazia Deledda), Paris, Grasset, 1919
Betty et ses amoureux (French translation of the novel The Two Vanrevels by Booth Tarkington), Paris, Hachette, 1936

References

External links
 Loup Odoevsky Maslov, Marc Hélys femme de lettres nazairienne, Histoire & Patrimoine n°97, March 2020, pp. 62, 73
 Loup Odoevsky Maslov, 91 Les Lera, une famille de diplomates nazairiens venus du Mexique, Histoire & Patrimoine n°98, July 2020, pp. 74, 95.
 Loup Odoevsky Maslov, Marc Hélys, Marie Lera, Saint-Nazaire, iyi akşamlar, in Chroniques de Saint-Nazaire
 Loup Odoevsky Maslov, De Marie Lera à la mystérieuse Leyla, Bulletin de l'Association Internationale des amis de Pierre Loti, N°42, December 2022, pp 8, 24.

1864 births
1958 deaths
19th-century French journalists
20th-century French journalists
20th-century French novelists
20th-century French translators
20th-century pseudonymous writers
19th-century pseudonymous writers
Pseudonymous women writers
French women journalists
French women novelists
People from Saint-Nazaire
Translators from Italian
Translators from English
Translators from Swedish
Translators from Polish
19th-century women journalists